Eclectic Guitar is a compilation recording by American guitarist Chet Atkins, released in 2007 on the El label.

History
The single disc contains 20 tracks from the three-year period of 1954 through 1956 representing Atkins' work in a variety of styles; mostly pop, jazz, and classical with very little country music. Most of the songs are solo performances.

The cover photo had been previously used for the 1961 reissue of A Session with Chet Atkins.

Track listing
 "Sunrise Serenade" (Carle) – 2:47
 "Honeysuckle Rose" (Andy Razaf, Fats Waller) – 2:41
 "Caravan" (Duke Ellington, Irving Mills, Juan Tizol) – 3:28
 "Mister Sandman" (Pat Ballard) – 2:18
 "Tenderly" (Walter Gross, Jack Lawrence) – 3:25
 "Minute Waltz" (Frédéric Chopin) – 1:47
 "Intermezzo" (Robert Henning, Heinz Provost) – 2:33
 "Minuet/Prelude" (Bach) – 2:30
 "Little Rock Getaway" (Carl Sigman, Joe Sullivan) – 2:19
 "Ochi Chornya (Dark Eyes)" (Traditional) – 2:46
 "La Golondrina" (Traditional) – 2:48
 "Indian Love Call" (Rudolf Friml, Oscar Hammerstein, Otto Harbach) – 2:58
 "St. Louis Blues" (W. C. Handy) – 3:01
 "Alice Blue Gown" (Joseph McCarthy, Harry Tierney) – 2:22
 "Malaguena" (Ernesto Lecuona) – 2:48
 "Gavotte in D" (François Joseph Gossec) – 1:43
 "Waltz in A Flat" (Johannes Brahms) – 1:50
 "Adelita" (Tarrega) – 1:39
 "Petite Walz" (Traditional) – 2:50
 "Liza (All the Clouds'll Roll Away)" (George Gershwin, Ira Gershwin, Gus Kahn) – 2:46

Personnel
Chet Atkins – guitar
Ray Edenton – guitar
Poppa John Gordy	 – piano, celeste
Buddy Harman – drums
Marvin Hughes – piano, celeste
Ernie Newton – bass
Dale Potter – fiddle

References

2007 compilation albums
Chet Atkins compilation albums